Pine Mountain may refer to:

Natural formations

Australia 

 Pine Mountain (Victoria), large monolith located in Burrowa-Pine Mountain National Park

United States 
Pine Mountain Wilderness, a protected wilderness area in Prescott National Forest in Arizona, United States
Pine Mountain Ridge (California), ridge in the Los Padres National Forest between the Topatopa Mountains and the San Emigdio Mountains, United States
Pine Mountain Reserve (Connecticut), a reserve in Ridgefield, Connecticut.
Pine Mountain Range, Georgia, United States
Pine Mountain (Bartow County, Georgia), United States
Pine Mountain (Cobb County, Georgia), United States
Pine Mountain (Appalachian Mountains), a ridge running through Kentucky, Virginia, and Tennessee, United States
Pine Mountain (Taconic Mountains), a mountain in western Massachusetts, United States
Pine Mountain (Missouri), United States
Pine Mountain (New York) (disambiguation), several elevations, United States
Pine Mountain (Oregon), United States
Pine Mountain (Grayson County, Virginia), United States

Populated places

Australia 

 Pine Mountain, Queensland, a locality in the City of Ipswich

United States 
Pine Mountain Club, California, a populated place, United States
Pine Mountain, Harris County, Georgia, a town, United States
Pine Mountain, Rabun County, Georgia, an unincorporated community, United States
Pine Mountain, Kentucky, United States

See also
Pine Mountain Observatory in Oregon, U.S.
Pine Mountain Music Festival in Michigan, U.S.
Pine Mountain Ski Jump, Iron Mountain, Michigan, U.S.
Pine Mountain State Resort Park, Kentucky, U.S.
Pine Mountain, a brand of firelog made by Jarden Home brands